After Dark is a British late night television discussion programme, produced by Open Media. It was broadcast weekly on Channel 4 between 1 May 1987 and 6 April 1991, and returned with various specials between 1993 and 1997. The programme ran again weekly for a single season in 2003 on the BBC. Here follows a complete list of all editions, with dates of live transmission and the names of all guests and hosts.

Series 1

Series 2

Series 3

Series 4

Specials

BBC Four series

References

Lists of British non-fiction television series episodes